The General Electric XA100 is an American adaptive cycle engine demonstrator being developed by General Electric (GE) for the Lockheed Martin F-35 Lightning II and form the basis for the propulsion system for the United States Air Force's sixth generation fighter program, the Next Generation Air Dominance (NGAD).

The three-stream adaptive cycle design can direct air to the bypass third stream for increased fuel efficiency and cooling or to the core and fan streams for additional thrust and performance. The  thrust class engine is expected to be significantly more powerful and efficient than existing low-bypass turbofans.

Development

The U.S. Air Force and U.S. Navy began pursuing adaptive cycle engine in 2007 with the Adaptive Versatile Engine Technology (ADVENT) program, a part of the larger Versatile Affordable Advanced Turbine Engines (VAATE) program. This technology research program was then followed by the Adaptive Engine Technology Demonstrator (AETD) program in 2012, which continued to mature the technology, with tests performed using demonstrator engines. GE's ground demonstrator consists of a three-stage adaptive fan and a high pressure compressor derived from CFM LEAP’s ten-stage compressor; the tests in 2015 yielded the highest combined compressor and turbine temperatures in the history of jet propulsion. The follow-on Adaptive Engine Transition Program (AETP) was launched in 2016 to develop and test adaptive engines for sixth generation fighter propulsion as well as potential re-engining of the F-35 from the existing F135 turbofan engine. The demonstrators were assigned the designation XA100 for General Electric's design and XA101 for Pratt & Whitney's. The AETP goal is to demonstrate 25% improved fuel efficiency, 10% additional thrust, and significantly better thermal management. Further contract awards and modifications from Air Force Life Cycle Management Center (AFLCMC) in 2018 increased the focus on re-engining of the F-35, and GE's design became "F-35 design-centric"; there has also been investigations on applying the technology in upgrades for F-15, F-16, and F-22 propulsion systems. GE's detailed design was completed in February 2019, and initial testing at GE's high-altitude test facility in Evendale, Ohio was concluded in May 2021. GE expects that the A100 can enter service with the F-35A and C in 2027 at the earliest.

Design

The XA100 is a three-stream adaptive cycle engine that can adjust the bypass ratio and fan pressure to increase fuel efficiency or thrust, depending on the scenario. It does this by employing an adaptive fan that can direct air into a third bypass stream in order to increase fuel economy and act as a heat sink for cooling; in particular, this would enable greater use of the high speed, low altitude part of the F-35 envelope. The increased cooling and power generation also enables the potential employment of directed energy weapons in the future. When additional thrust is needed, the air from the third stream can be directed to the core and fan streams. In addition to three-stream adaptive cycle configuration, the engine also uses new heat-resistant materials such as ceramic matrix composites (CMC) to enable higher turbine temperatures and improved performance. According to GE, the engine can offer up to 35% increased range and 25% reduction in fuel burn over current low-bypass turbofans.

Applications
 Lockheed Martin F-35 (planned)
 Next Generation Air Dominance (NGAD) (planned, derivative)

Specifications (XA100-GE-100)

See also

References

External links

 GE Adaptive Cycle Engine site

XA100